Julio Alberto Moreno Casas (born 7 October 1958), known as Julio Alberto, is a Spanish retired footballer who played as a left-back.

During his professional career he played mainly for Atlético Madrid and Barcelona, amassing La Liga totals of 269 matches and 11 goals.

A Spain international in the mid-to-late 1980s, Julio Alberto represented the nation at the 1986 World Cup and Euro 1984.

Club career
Born in Candás, Asturias, Julio Alberto came through the ranks of Atlético Madrid, appearing rarely for the Colchoneros in his early years and also serving a Segunda División loan stint with Recreativo de Huelva in 1979–80. Fully promoted to the first team for the following campaign, he totalled 58 La Liga games over the next two seasons, subsequently attracting interest from FC Barcelona.

With Barça, the offensive-minded Julio Alberto played a further nine years, with opposed fates: he was a key element in the side's 1985 league conquest and, in the following campaign, scored a stunning goal against Juventus F.C. in the semi-finals of the European Cup, in a 1–0 home win (eventually 2–1 on aggregate). He would also start in the penalty shootout loss to FC Steaua București in the final.

From 1988 to 1991, however, Julio Alberto only appeared in 29 matches as the "Dream Team" was coming to fruition, retiring after only three appearances in the latter season as Barcelona won the national championship.

International career
Julio Alberto earned 34 caps for Spain over four years, and was included in the squad for UEFA Euro 1984 (appearing in all the games for the runners-up) and the 1986 FIFA World Cup. His debut came on 29 February in a friendly leading to Euro 1984, against Luxembourg, and he received the game's only yellow card in a 1–0 away victory.

Post-retirement
After retiring, Julio Alberto fell into a deep depression which led to a severe drug addiction. Eventually he recovered, becoming a lecturer on the subject while he also began assisting former club Barcelona in a community role, working with fans and the foundation.

Honours
Barcelona
La Liga: 1984–85, 1990–91
Copa del Rey: 1982–83, 1987–88, 1989–90
Supercopa de España: 1983
Copa de la Liga: 1983, 1986
UEFA Cup Winners' Cup: 1988–89
European Cup runner-up: 1985–86

Spain
UEFA European Championship runner-up: 1984

References

External links

1958 births
Living people
Spanish footballers
Footballers from Asturias
Association football defenders
La Liga players
Segunda División players
Segunda División B players
Atlético Madrid B players
Atlético Madrid footballers
Recreativo de Huelva players
FC Barcelona players
Spain under-21 international footballers
Spain under-23 international footballers
Spain amateur international footballers
Spain B international footballers
Spain international footballers
UEFA Euro 1984 players
1986 FIFA World Cup players